Beauchamp is a locality in Victoria, Australia in the local government area of the Rural City of Swan Hill and the Shire of Gannawarra. The post office opened in 1902 and closed on 31 December 1944.

References

Towns in Victoria (Australia)
Rural City of Swan Hill